The 2015 Korean Series was the championship series of the 2015 KBO League season. The Samsung Lions, four-time consecutive defending champions, played the winner of the playoff series, the Doosan Bears. The Doosan Bears defeated the regular season champions, the Samsung Lions in five games to win their fourth Korean Series championship.

Roster

Summary

Matchups

Game 1

Game 2

Game 3

Game 4

Game 5

See also
2015 KBO League season
2015 World Series
2015 Japan Series

References

Korean Series
Samsung Lions
Doosan Bears
Korean Series
Korean Series